Bailey Bartlett (January 29, 1750 – September 9, 1830) was a member of the U.S. House of Representatives from Massachusetts.

Early life 

He was born in Haverhill in the Province of Massachusetts Bay to Enoch Bartlett (April 5, 1715 – January 1789)  and Anna Bayley (March 4, 1725 – January 23, 1750) and engaged in mercantile pursuits there until 1789.

In 1786 Bartlett married Peggy Leonard White. Together they had twelve children.

Career 

He was a member of the Massachusetts House of Representatives from 1781 to 1784, and again in 1788. He was a member of the convention which adopted the Constitution of the United States in 1788. He served in the Massachusetts Senate the next year. He was appointed high sheriff of Essex County by Governor John Hancock and served from July 1, 1789, until December 5, 1811. He was elected as a Federalist to the Fifth Congress to fill the vacancy after the resignation of Theophilus Bradbury. He was reelected to the Sixth Congress and served from November 27, 1797 to March 3, 1801. He was not a candidate for renomination in 1800. He served as treasurer of Essex County in 1812. He was again appointed high sheriff of Essex County on June 20, 1812, and served until his death. He was a delegate to the State constitutional convention in 1820.

Death and interment 

He died on September 9, 1830 in Haverhill, Massachusetts and is buried in Pentucket Cemetery, Haverhill, Essex County, Massachusetts.

Notes

References

External links

1750 births
1830 deaths
Politicians from Haverhill, Massachusetts
Members of the Massachusetts House of Representatives
Massachusetts state senators
Sheriffs of Essex County, Massachusetts
Federalist Party members of the United States House of Representatives from Massachusetts
County treasurers in Massachusetts
People of colonial Massachusetts
Burials in Massachusetts